Willow Creek Dam is a dam in Morrow County of the U.S. state of Oregon, located just east of Heppner's city limits. It was the first major dam in the United States constructed of roller-compacted concrete.

The dam's drainage basin is 
of arid rolling hills in the lower basin but with headwaters in the northern Umatilla National Forest.
The dam's original purpose was primarily to store water for flood control, but also to serve recreation, fish and wildlife, and irrigation uses. The dam impounds Willow Creek to create Willow Creek Lake.

History 
A major flood killed approximately one quarter of Heppner's population in June 1903—about 250 people.

A flood control study was completed in 1962 at a total cost of $219.  In 1965, a flood control project was authorized by U.S. Congress.

In 1979, the purpose of a dam project was changed to defer irrigation development for the future and eliminate water supply and water quality control.

Construction feasibility tests in 1972 placed a few layers of roller-compacted concrete.
A 1:36 model (one inch equals three feet) was built and studied to determine downstream flooding and pool siltation characteristics as affected by the dam's spillway.

The dam was constructed by the Army Corps of Engineers between November 1981 and February 1983.
Construction completed nearly on schedule, despite the workers initially being unfamiliar with the materials, processing, and techniques.  It came in less than its budget of $50 million at $35 million.  
The dam's construction validated economic and construction speed benefits where  of concrete were finished in less than five months at about $17 per cubic meter ($13/yd3), which includes additional efforts to correct defects.

However, as soon as the lake began filling, significant leakage was evident through the seams of the layers of concrete. The lake was drained and a $2 million remedial effort included injecting grout through bores drilled from top to bottom. Concern over the dam's safety has continued, especially with the memory of the 1903 flash flood.

Within a few years of construction, problems were noted with stratification of the water and anoxic decomposition producing hydrogen sulfide. Concerns were expressed that this could in turn give rise to sulfuric acid leading to concrete damage. Controversy continued for some years and the handling of the problem itself was criticized.  In 2004, an aeration plant was installed to address the root cause, as had been called for 18 years earlier.  Subsequent controversy surrounded the politics of a small town being used as an experiment for new construction technology.
SolarBee devices to circulate the water were installed in 2009.

The dam won an American Society of Civil Engineers (ASCE) award in 1985.

See also
List of lakes in Oregon

References

External links 
 Photo gallery of Heppner flood US Army Corps of Engineers, 1903 and 1971

Buildings and structures in Morrow County, Oregon
Dams in Oregon
Heppner, Oregon
United States Army Corps of Engineers dams
Dams completed in 1983
1983 establishments in Oregon
Roller-compacted concrete dams
Gravity dams